Q-Games, Limited is a video game developer based in Nakagyō-ku, Kyoto, Japan which works closely with both Nintendo and Sony.

Foundation
Q-Games was founded by Dylan Cuthbert, who previously worked at Argonaut Software and helped create Starglider and Starglider 2 for Argonaut Software, then gave programming assistance to X and the first Star Fox for Nintendo. He also developed Star Fox 2 to completion before heading off to work at Sony America to make Blasto on the PlayStation. After this, Cuthbert moved back to Japan to work at Sony Japan, where, in early 1999, he developed the Duck in a Bath technical demo (Ducks demo) that showcased the PlayStation 2's power to early developers and publishers. Following that, he developed Pipo Saru 2001 and then left Sony to start Q-Games Ltd. in Kyoto in September 2001.

History
The studio's first few years were spent accumulating staff and developing behind-doors technology projects for a number of clients including Sony and Microsoft. At E3 2004, they showed two graphic technology demos for the PlayStation Portable and then internally began development on two games, one for the Game Boy Advance and one for the Nintendo DS. These titles were announced as Digidrive (part of the bit Generations series of puzzle games for the Game Boy Advance) and Star Fox Command respectively. Both were later released.

Following these projects, Q-Games began to collaborate with Sony Computer Entertainment, becoming a second-party studio partner, by developing the PixelJunk series of downloadable games for the PlayStation 3. They are available for download and purchase on the PlayStation Network Store worldwide. PixelJunk games are presented in 1080p full HD. PixelJunk made its worldwide debut on 11 July 2007 at E3 2007, held in Santa Monica, CA. At TGS 2009, Q-Games confirmed that it is extremely unlikely these games will ever appear on the Xbox 360.

Throughout its existence, Q-Games has continued to partner with multiple platform holders directly including Nintendo, Sony, and Google.

Q-Games have also worked with Nintendo again, releasing several games for the Nintendo DSi's DSiWare digital distribution service from 2009 to 2010. The studio would co-develop Star Fox 64 3D for the Nintendo 3DS with Nintendo EAD in releasing in 2011.

At Gamescom 2014, Q-Games announced The Tomorrow Children, an online adventure game that featured asynchronous multiplayer. The title was co-developed by Japan Studio and published by Sony Interactive Entertainment. The game launched in 2016 as a free to play title for the PlayStation 4, but was shut down by Sony after a year of operation.

Q-Games has also developed a number of titles exclusive for Apple Arcade including a new Frogger.

In 2021, it was announced that PixelJunk Raiders would be launching on Google Stadia. The title made use of the State Share feature to allow players to jump into other players game via a screenshot or video capture.

Q-Games negotiated with Sony to secure the rights to The Tomorrow Children in November 2021, and stated their intent to revive the game in the future. It was re-released by Q-Games in September 2022 as The Tomorrow Children: Phoenix Edition.

Games developed

Other projects
As well as games development, Q-Games developed technology directly with Sony Japan for the PlayStation 3. The PS3's XMB (Xross Media Bar) interface, background and music visualizer were developed by Q-Games and they are credited with 3D Graphics Technology in the About PS3 section of the PS3's OS.

PlayStation Home
On September 24, 2009, Q-Games released their own developer space for their series, PixelJunk in the PlayStation 3's online community-based service, PlayStation Home to the Japanese version and on October 9, 2009, to the North American version. The "PixelJunk Museum" (Japan), or "PixelJunk Exhibition" (North America), features the games PixelJunk Eden, PixelJunk Monsters, and PixelJunk Racers. For PixelJunk Eden there are glass wall art displays, for PixelJunk Monsters, there are displays of familiar characters from the game, and for PixelJunk Racers, there are displays of two different race cars. There is also a virtual shop in the space selling PixelJunk virtual items. In Japan's version from September 24, 2009, to October 9, 2009, near the shop, there was a panel that took users to a virtual version of Q-Games TGS 2009 Booth. Called the "Q-Games virtual public TGS Booth", it was a virtual recreation of the Q-Games TGS 2009 Booth that had a free T-shirt and a video screen. On December 17, 2009, they released another exhibition room to the "PixelJunk Exhibition" space. This room is to display PixelJunk Shooter and is called the "PixelJunk Shooter Mother Ship Hangar."

References

Sources
Chris Kohler's book Power-Up: How Japanese Video Games Gave the World an Extra Life - Chapter 6.
An Interview on Gamasutra.com with Q-Games
Dylan Cuthbert's profile on N-Sider.com
Dylan Cuthbert video interview on the 1-UP Show

External links

Q-Games Official website

Companies based in Kyoto
Japanese companies established in 2001
Video game companies established in 2001
Video game companies of Japan
Video game development companies